The Real Housewives of Melbourne (abbreviated RHOMelbourne) is an Australian reality television series that premiered 23 February 2014 on Arena. It was developed as one of the international installments of The Real Housewives, an American television franchise. The series chronicles the lives of several women living in Melbourne, Australia.

The series originally focused on Gina Liano, Jackie Gillies, Andrea Moss, Janet Roach, Chyka Keebaugh and Lydia Schiavello; the lineup currently consists of Gillies, Roach, Gamble Breaux, Cherry Dipietrantonio, Kyla Kirkpatrick and Simone Elliott. Of the original housewives, Moss left after the first season, whilst Keebaugh departed after the third and Liano and Schiavello after the fourth. The remaining housewives joined in later seasons: Breaux in the second, Dipietrantonio, Kirkpatrick and Elliott in the fifth. Other housewives include Pettifleur Berenger (seasons 2–3), Susie McLean (season 3), Sally Bloomfield (season 4),Venus Behbahani-Clark (season 4) and Anjali Rao (season 5).

Its success allowed for the development of The Real Housewives franchise by Matchbox Pictures and similar spin-off series based in Sydney and Auckland, New Zealand.

Foxtel announced 10 September 2019 that the show had been renewed for a fifth season to be aired on Arena in 2020. This was later pushed to 2021 due to production delays caused by the COVID-19 pandemic.

Overview and casting

Seasons 1–4
The Real Housewives of Melbourne was first announced by Matchbox Pictures as The Real Housewives of Australia and was set to air in 2013. On 28 July 2013, it was announced that the series had been renamed The Real Housewives of Melbourne, along with the full cast of six women. The six women include Jackie Gillies, Chyka Keebaugh, Gina Liano, Andrea Moss, Janet Roach, and Lydia Schiavello. They were handpicked by the producers, from over one hundred women during an eight-month process. Filming for the series began in July 2013. On 21 January 2014, the official cast photo and premiere date of 23 February 2014 were announced. The series at the time was the second biggest local series launch following SoHo's Wentworth.

Moss departed the series after the first season.
On 8 May 2014, the series was renewed for a second season. Brian Walsh, an executive director of Foxtel, discussed the renewal, "There is no doubt that The Real Housewives of Melbourne has been a game changer for Foxtel. The incredible reaction to our Housewives, including the blockbuster ratings, the huge social media impact and the overall buzz surrounding the series has meant the decision for another season was a very easy one." In season two, two newcomers joined the show, Gamble Breaux and Pettifleur Berenger, and premiered 22 February 2015. Manuela Pless-Bennett joined the series in a recurring capacity as a friend to Janet. Pless-Bennett was featured in interviews and attended the reunion.
Friend to the wives Lisa Tonkin made more frequent guest appearances throughout the season and returned to her guest role for the second and third seasons.

The series was subsequently renewed for a third season. All the housewives returned from the previous season, along with newcomer with Susie McLean joining the cast and without Pless-Bennett. The third season premiered 21 February 2016. Prior to the conclusion of the third season, on 8 May 2016, original housewife Chyka Keebaugh confirmed that she would not be returning to the series.

On 11 May 2016, Lydia Schiavello revealed there would be a fourth season but filming may be delayed to film The Real Housewives of Sydney first. A month later in June 2016, Liano also confirmed there would be a season four and the filming delay for the Sydney series, adding that "the original girls are out of contract now. They haven't approached us to renegotiate contracts yet." In December 2016, season four was officially confirmed by Foxtel, also being reported that filming is set to begin in early 2017. On 29 April 2017, it was announced that Berenger would not return to the series. On 17 May 2017, the season 4 cast was announced, with Venus Behbahani-Clark and Sally Bloomfield joining the cast. This also confirmed the departures of Keebaugh, Berenger and McLean. However, Keebaugh did make a guest appearance during one episode in the fourth season.

Season 5–present
In September 2019, Foxtel announced a fifth season, set to premiere in 2020. Foxtel Executive Brian Walsh also confirmed the upcoming fifth season would include 'a big cast shake up.' In February 2020, Bloomfield, Gillies & Behbahani-Clark announced they were departing the show, while Schiavello confirmed her return. On 19 February, the cast was released, confirming the return of Liano, Roach and Breaux, alongside the previously confirmed Schiavello, as well as the addition of Anjali Rao, Kyla Kirkpatrick and Cherry Dipietrantonio. According to cast member Janet Roach, Gillies was set to return to the show, however by deciding to leave and to start a family, she was replaced by Schiavello who wasn’t originally set to return to the series.

On 18 March 2020, Foxtel has announced that filming for season 5 had temporarily been paused due to the 
COVID-19 pandemic. In a statement released by Foxtel and Matchbox Pictures, “The Health and Safety of our cast and crew is our top priority”.

On 11 June 2020, it was confirmed by cast member Janet Roach that filming for season 5 was to resume in July, however she announced that Foxtel had decided to push the filming dates back to January 2021.

On 14 April 2021, Foxtel re-confirmed the cast of the fifth season with Roach and Breaux reprising their roles as well as the additions of Anjali Rao, Kyla Kirkpatrick, Cherry Dipietrantonio (who all had been previously announced). Gillies (who had previously departed) also returned to the series with new addition Simone Elliott. This also confirmed the departures of Liano and Schiavello (who had been previously set to return). The fifth season premiered on 10 October 2021. Following the conclusion of the season's seventh episode, Rao departed the series after one season. An all cast reunion was not filmed for the fifth season, marking the first time in the series history to not feature a reunion.

Timeline of housewives

Episodes

International broadcast
In the United States, the series premiered 3 August 2014, on Bravo, the same network that initiated The Real Housewives franchise. The series returned for a second season on 5 March 2015. However, unlike season one which aired during daytime on Sunday, season two aired during prime time – the first of the international The Real Housewives series to do so. In the United Kingdom, the series premiered 6 November 2014, and airs on ITVBe. In Sweden TV3 started airing the first series in early January 2016. The series returned to Bravo for a third season on 22 July 2016, but now airing during prime time on a Friday. In Canada, the series started airing on Slice in August 2016. In New Zealand, the series premiered 25 October 2016 on Bravo, the same network that initiated The Real Housewives franchise by Matchbox Pictures.
On January 19, 2022, the first four seasons have become available in the United States on Discovery+ with a subscription. While the first three seasons have in the past aired in the U.S. on Bravo, this marks the first time season 4 has officially premiered albeit on a streaming service.

Reception
In the United States, the premiere episode attracted 414,000 viewers, a 39% increase to the timeslot compared to the month prior. The second-season premiere, which for the first time saw the series air in primetime, grew on the prior season's premiere scoring 534,000 viewers.

Awards and nominations

Spin-offs
In September 2014, Real Housewives producer Matchbox Pictures announced that they were considering filming Real Housewives in a second location – namely Sydney or the Gold Coast. In addition, a Judge Judy-type show has been considered starring Real Housewives star Gina Liano, with a pilot episode filmed in December 2014. In September 2015, it was again reported that producer of the series, Matchbox Productions, was possibly searching for potential candidates for a The Real Housewives franchise to be based in Sydney, or the Gold Coast. On 27 February 2016 it was revealed that the producers were looking for potential cast mates in Brisbane. In June 2017, it was planned that Gina Liano would receive a Judge Judy style spin-off entitled "Judge Gina". The series was to contain 40 episodes of 30 minutes. This series didn't eventuate.

References

External links

 
 
 
 New faces stir up Housewives
 Gamble Breaux from RHOM reveals Sydney summers with a RHOS

 
2014 Australian television series debuts
2010s Australian reality television series
English-language television shows
Television shows set in Melbourne
Arena (TV network) original programming
Television series by Matchbox Pictures
Australian television series based on American television series
Women in Australia
Television shows filmed in Australia
2020s Australian reality television series